The Forever Trap is an exclusive to audio Doctor Who story, produced as part of BBC Books' New Series Adventures line, and the second entry in the series to be produced. Read by Catherine Tate, it is the second non-televised Doctor Who adventure to feature the companion Donna Noble.  It was released on CD on 9 October 2008.

Featuring 
 Tenth Doctor
 Donna Noble

References

Audiobooks based on Doctor Who
Tenth Doctor audio plays
2008 audio plays
Works by Dan Abnett